The Juno Cup of 2010 was an ice hockey game which took place in Torbay, Newfoundland and Labrador on 16 April 2010. This was the seventh annual such competition which is a charitable event held in conjunction with the 2010 Juno Awards in nearby St. John's. Michael Landsberg of TSN was the play-by-play announcer.

The NHL Greats won the game 9–8. Proceeds support the musical education initiative MusiCounts.

Roster
Competing teams consist of the NHL Greats (NHL players) and The Rockers (musicians).

NHL Greats

 Troy Crowder
 Brad Dalgarno
 Harold Druken
 Andrew McKim
 Mark Napier
 Gary Roberts
 Greg Smyth
 Andy Sullivan

Rockers

 Paul Aucoin (The Hylozoists)
 Rich Aucoin
 Barney Bentall
 Patrick Birtles (Ten Second Epic)
 Jay Bodner (Eagle & Hawk)
 George Canyon
 Classified
 Evan Cranley (Stars/Broken Social Scene)
 Jim Cuddy (Blue Rodeo) – captain
 Randy Curnew
 Tim D'eon (Wintersleep)
 John Dinsmore (NQ Arbuckle)
 Alan Doyle – coach
 Vince Fontaine (Eagle & Hawk)
 Jonathan Gallant (Billy Talent)
 Rex Goudie
 Allan Hawco (Republic of Doyle)
 Rob Higgins (Dearly Beloved)
 Raven Kanatakta (Digging Roots)
 Pete Kesper (NQ Arbuckle)
 François Lamoureux
 Domenic Mancuso
 Sean McCann (Great Big Sea)
 Greg Millson (Great Lake Swimmers)
 Paul Murphy (Wintersleep)
 Andrew Usenik (Ten Second Epic)

References

External links
 Juno Cup official site

Juno Cup
Ice hockey in Newfoundland and Labrador
2009–10 in Canadian ice hockey